Mercato may refer to:
Mercato (Naples), a quarter of Naples, Italy
Mercato, the municipal seat of Giffoni Valle Piana

See also
 Mercato San Severino, a municipality of the Province of Salerno, Campania
 Mercato Saraceno, a municipality of the Province of Forlì-Cesena, Emilia-Romagna
 Mercato Centrale (Florence), the central market of Florence, Italy
 Addis Mercato, the largest open-air marketplace in Africa